Armand de Mestral,  (born 17 November 1941) is a Canadian academic and international arbitration expert.

Born in Montreal, Quebec, de Mestral was educated at Whitgift School in Croydon, United Kingdom. He is a law professor at the McGill University and an expert in international law. He teaches courses on constitutional law and the law of the European Union.  He is also a senior fellow at the Centre for International Governance Innovation. He has an undergraduate and master's degree from Harvard University, a law degree from McGill University, as well as honorary doctorates from Université de Lyon and Kwansei Gakuin University.  He also served a term as president of the Canadian Red Cross. He was made member of the Order of Canada in 2007.

He is married to Rosalind Pepall, a curator at the Musée de Beaux Arts and they have two sons Philippe and Charles.

References

1941 births
Living people
Canadian legal scholars
Harvard University alumni
McGill University Faculty of Law alumni
Academic staff of the McGill University Faculty of Law
Members of the Order of Canada
People from Montreal
People educated at Whitgift School